Green Moor is a small hamlet in South Yorkshire, England, in the parish of Hunshelf and close to Penistone and Oxspring.  Green Moor used to be a stone quarry in the last century but has since become a predominantly commuter and retirement village.  Green Moor is also the site of activity centre used by the Sheffield and District Boys' Brigade Battalion.

History
Sandstone quarries in the area were once worked on a large scale. During the nineteenth century stone paving was transported by sea to London. There was a Greenmoor Wharf at Southwark (and a  Greenmoor Road in Enfield, London), and some of the stone flags around the Houses of Parliament came from Green Moor.  Later transport was by rail from Wortley Station, where there was a stone sawmill.  Green Moor Delf Quarry stretched back from the former Rock Inn.  Trunce or California Quarry is to the North West, below the village. The remains of a "Stoneway", a roadway of channelled stone slabs, link the quarry to Well Hill Road.  Victoria Quarry is to the northeast of the village, close to Wortley Top Forge. Close by is a stack of stone slabs, presumably left when the quarry closed.  There were a number of other small quarries in the area.  Since the last quarry closed in 1936, all have been filled in to some degree.  The village has an old well pumphouse and a set of village stocks that have been preserved.

The methodist chapel was built in the nineteenth century by subscription from local workers and is still used for worship.   Like many villages in the area, Greenmoor was and still is part of the north Sheffield local Christmas carolling tradition, with a more Methodist flavour than most village sings, and its village anthem is "Christians awake".  From 1900 to the 1970s Greenmoor singers would travel by foot for up to 12 hours of visiting houses and performing the local songs.  The Walton family performed accompaniment on stringed instruments.  The tradition continues, though cars are now usually used to replace the long walks.

The parish council worked to purchase a plot of former quarry land known as the "Isle of Skye", for which the parish clerk, David Horsfall, received an MBE from the Queen in 2015 for services to the community.  The Isle of Skye is now public land for use by all residents and visitors.

The historical novel Echoing Hills by Phyllis Crossland is set in Green Moor in the eighteenth century.

There is a Green Moor Way in Henrietta, NY, USA.

People
Adventurer and TV personality Nick Sanders lived here during the 1990s.  Folk singer Kate Rusby and mathcore band Rolo Tomassi live nearby.  Director Ken Loach was based in the village during his filming of Kes.

See also
Listed buildings in Hunshelf

References
Echoing Hills, by Phyllis Crossland. Bridge Publications, 1988. 
 The Hunshelf Chat newsletter serves the village and surrounding parish and is available on Barnsley Council's website.

External links

Hamlets in South Yorkshire
Geography of the Metropolitan Borough of Barnsley